The Great National Assembly of Alba Iulia was an assembly held on 1 December 1918 in the city of Alba Iulia in which a total of 1,228 delegates from several areas inhabited by ethnic Romanians declared the union of Transylvania with Romania. Regular ethnic Romanian civilians were also called to participate, and these came from all regions inhabited by Romanians; in total, the assembly was attended by some 100,000 people. The union of Transylvania with Romania was declared with the adoption of the  during the assembly.

Even though Blaj and Sibiu were considered as places where the assembly could take place, the city of Alba Iulia ended up being chosen for this. This was because its Romanian militia was the strongest of Transylvania at the time and also because of the symbolic value of the city for having been a capital of the former Principality of Transylvania and because of the actions in the city of Michael the Brave, who united the principalities of Moldavia, Transylvania and Wallachia in 1600.

Today, the day of the Great National Assembly is commemorated as the Great Union Day, the national day of Romania.

See also
 1918 Great National Assembly election
 Great Union

References

 
Great Union (Romania)
Romania in World War I
History of Romania
History of Transylvania
Romanian nationalism
National unifications
1918 conferences
1918 in Romania
December 1918 events in Europe